List of school districts in Monterey County, California

On February 27, 2008, Arnold Schwarzenegger and Superintendent of Public Instruction, Jack O'Connell placed several school districts in the county in their list of school districts that need help due to the school's failure to raise their Standardized Testing and Reporting (STAR) Results under the No Child Left Behind Act for the past five years. 

 Alisal Union Elementary School District 1
 Bradley Union Elementary School District
 Carmel Unified School District
 Chualar Union Elementary School District
 Gonzales Union Elementary School District
 Gonzales Union High School District
 Graves Elementary School District
 Greenfield Union Elementary School District 2
 South Monterey County Joint Union High School District
 King City Union Elementary School District 1
 Lagunita Elementary School District
 Mission Union Elementary School District
 Monterey Peninsula Unified School District 1
 North Monterey County Unified School District
 Pacific Grove Unified School District
 Big Sur Unified School District
 Salinas City Elementary School District 1
 Salinas Union High School District
 San Antonio Union Elementary School District
 San Ardo Union Elementary School District
 San Lucas Union Elementary School District
 Santa Rita Union Elementary School District
 Soledad Unified School District
 Spreckels Union Elementary School District
 Washington Union School District

1 These districts were placed under "Moderate" help by the Governor.

2 This district was placed under "Intensive" help by the Governor.

References

External links 
 Monterey County Office of Education
 Monterey County Office of Education - School directory

School districts in Monterey County, California
Monterey